Étienne-Joseph Hurault (28 October 1873, in Châlons-sur-Marne – 7 April 1934) was a French Roman Catholic bishop.

He was bishop of Viviers from 1923 to 1930 (designated 20 December 1923, ordained bishop 25 March 1924 and installed the following 1 April) and bishop of Nancy from 1930 to 1934 (designated bishop 23 December 1930, installed 12 February 1931).

References

External links
http://www.catholic-hierarchy.org/

1873 births
1934 deaths
Bishops of Nancy
Bishops of Viviers